Inglun, also known as Ingalun, is a village and gram panchayat in India, situated in Mawal taluka of Pune district in the state of Maharashtra. The village is located close to Thokarwadi dam which is a good source of water for farmers. Inglun is also very famous for consistent rainfall every year.

Administration
The village is administrated by a sarpanch, an elected representative who leads a gram panchayat. At the time of the 2011 Census of India, the village was the headquarters for the eponymous gram panchayat, which also governed the village of Kune Ansute.

Demographics
At the 2011 census, the village comprised 101 households. The population of 506 was split between 246 males and 260 females.

See also
List of villages in Mawal taluka

References

Villages in Mawal taluka
Gram Panchayats in Pune district